Frederick or Fred Thompson may refer to:

Sportspeople
 Frederick Thompson (athlete) (1880–1956), British track and field athlete
 Rangi Thompson (Frederick Haughton Thompson, 1908–1971), New Zealand rower
 Fredy Thompson (born 1982), Guatemalan footballer
 Fred Thompson (footballer, born c. 1873) (c. 1873–1958), English footballer
 Fred Thompson (footballer, born 1870) (1870–1898), English footballer
 Fred Thompson (rugby union) (1890–1915), Australian rugby union player
 Fred Thompson (coach) (1933–2019), American lawyer and track and field coach

Other
 Frederic Thompson (1873–1919), American engineer, inventor, and showman known for creating Luna Park and the New York Hippodrome
 Fred D. Thompson (businessman) (1915–1988), American publishing executive
 Frederick P. Thompson (1846–1922), Canadian entrepreneur and politician
 Fred Thompson (1942–2015), American politician and actor
 Fred W. Thompson (1900–1987), Canadian-American labor organizer and historian with the Industrial Workers of the World
 Frederic Christian Thompson (1944-2021), American entomologist
 Frederick L. Thompson (1871–1944), American politician
 Fred Thompson (writer) (1884–1949), English writer and librettist
 Frederick John Thompson (1935–2010), politician in Saskatchewan, Canada
 Frederick Ferris Thompson (1836–1899), American banker
 Frederick I. Thompson (1875–1952), American businessman and commissioner of the Federal Communications Commission
 Freddie Thompson (Irish criminal) (born 1980), Irish criminal convicted of murder in 2018

See also 
 Frederick Thomson (disambiguation)